Semyon Der-Arguchintsev (born September 15, 2000) is a Russian professional ice hockey forward currently playing for the Toronto Marlies of the American Hockey League (AHL) as a prospect to the Toronto Maple Leafs of the National Hockey League (NHL).

Playing career
In 2016, while playing for the CIHA White Midget AAA, Der-Arguchintsev was selected in the 2016 Ontario Hockey League (OHL) Priority Selection Draft, 2nd round, 27th overall, by the Peterborough Petes. After scoring 80 points in 131 OHL games, in the 2018 NHL Entry Draft, Der-Arguchintsev was selected in the 3rd round, 76th overall, by the Toronto Maple Leafs. Impressing at his first Maple Leafs rookie training camp, Der-Arguchintsev was signed by the Maple Leafs to a three-year, entry-level contract on September 22, 2018.

In the following year, Der-Arguchintsev nabbed 46 points in 62 games in the OHL, and played 3 regular season games for the Newfoundland Growlers, the Maple Leafs East Coast Hockey League affiliate, acquiring 2 points. He featured in 9 playoff games adding a further 2 points, and helped the Growlers defeat the Toledo Walleye to win the Kelly Cup.

Returning to junior in the following 2019–20 season, playing with fellow Leafs prospect Nicholas Robertson, Der-Arguchintsev scored 12 goals and acquired 63 assists for 75 points in 55 games before the season was canceled due to the COVID-19 pandemic. His 63 assists was third in the OHL, behind Marco Rossi of the Ottawa 67's and Cole Perfetti of the Saginaw Spirit.

Approaching his first full professional season, and with North American 2020–21 season set to be delayed due to the ongoing pandemic, on October 26, 2020, Der-Arguchintsev was loaned by the Maple Leafs to join Russian club, Torpedo Nizhny Novgorod of the Kontinental Hockey League. He returned to North America in the following season.

On December 6, 2022, Der-Arguchintsev made his NHL debut in a 4-0 win over the Dallas Stars.

Career statistics

Awards and honours

References

External links
 

2000 births
Living people
Ice hockey people from Moscow
Newfoundland Growlers players
Peterborough Petes (ice hockey) players
Russian ice hockey centres
Toronto Maple Leafs draft picks
Toronto Maple Leafs players
Toronto Marlies players
Torpedo Nizhny Novgorod players